Chepuru is a village in East Godavari district of the Indian state of Andhra Pradesh. It is administered under Tuni mandal.

Geography 

Chepuru is located at a distance of 13 km South-West of its Mandal Headquarters Tuni.

Demographics

The total population constitute,  males,  females and  children, in the age group of 0–6 years. The average literacy rate stands at 61.73%, significantly lower than the national average of 73.00%.

References 

Villages in East Godavari district